Santiria impressinervis is a species of plant in the family Burseraceae. It is endemic to the Kelabit Highlands in the Malaysian region of Sarawak on the island of Borneo.

References

impressinervis
Endemic flora of Borneo
Trees of Borneo
Flora of Sarawak
Vulnerable plants
Taxonomy articles created by Polbot